Anthony "Tony" Gregg (born 1986) is an American professional poker player best known for winning the $111,111 One Drop High Roller in 2013 for a prize of $4,830,000. He is also known for his great successes at the PCA where he has made a record three appearances at the main event final table before anybody else has made the final table on two occasions. Despite making the final table three times he has not won a main event falling short and finishing 2nd on two of the three occasions and finishing sixth at the other final table. During his career he has racked up a total of over $10 million in live tournament cashes and is currently the 34th highest earner of all time in live tournament poker.

Gregg played Magic: The Gathering before turning to poker.

World Series of Poker

References

American poker players
Living people
1986 births
People from Columbia, Maryland